Michael K. Brame (January 27, 1944 — August 16, 2010) was an American linguist and professor at the University of Washington, and founding editor of the peer-reviewed research journal, Linguistic Analysis. He was known for his theory of recursive categorical syntax. He also co-authored with his wife, Galina Popova, several books on the identity of the writer who used the pseudonym "William Shakespeare".

Early life and education
Michael Brame was born on January 27, 1944, in San Antonio, Texas.

Brame started his study of linguistics at the University of Texas at Austin, receiving his BA in 1966. That summer he studied Egyptian Arabic at the American University of Cairo. That fall, Brame began a PhD program at the Massachusetts Institute of Technology, studying under Morris Halle and Noam Chomsky, who was his adviser. He received his PhD in 1970 or 1971. His dissertation was titled Arabic Phonology: Implications for  Phonological Theory and Historical Semitic.

Brame was a Fulbright scholar (Netherlands, 1973-1974).

Recursive categorical syntax

Brame developed an algebraic theory of syntax, recursive categorical syntax, also sometimes called algebraic syntax, as an alternative to transformational-generative grammar.   It is a type of dependency grammar, and is related to link grammars.

Brame formulated an algebra, (technically a non-associative groupoid with inverses) of lexical items (words and phrases), or lexes for short.  A lex is a string representation of a word or idiomatic phrase together with a notation specifying what other word classes can bond with the string and in which order.

Shakespeare's Fingerprints
In 2002, Brame co-authored with his wife Galina Popova a book titled Shakespeare's Fingerprints. Over the next two years, they would publish three more books on the topic.

Personal life
Brame was married to Galina Popova.

Bibliography

Dissertation

Books

On Shakespeare

Selected articles

Recursive categorical syntax

See also

References

Citations

Works cited

Further reading

1944 births
2010 deaths
20th-century linguists
Dependency grammar
Grammar frameworks
Linguists from the United States
Massachusetts Institute of Technology alumni
People from San Antonio
Shakespeare authorship theorists
University of Texas at Austin alumni
University of Washington faculty